Chapadu is a village in YSR Kadapa district of the Indian state of Andhra Pradesh. It is located in Chapadu mandal of Badvel revenue division.

References 

Villages in Kadapa district